The Tour of Uppsala is an annual professional road bicycle race for women in Sweden.

Winners

References

Cycle races in Sweden
Recurring sporting events established in 2018
Women's road bicycle races
Annual sporting events in Sweden